Armamentarium may refer to

Medical equipment
the Latin term for an arsenal
 Armamentarium (album), 2007 album by German melodic death metal band Neaera